Shane Walker may refer to:

Shane Walker (rugby league born 1971), former player for the St. George Dragons, Eastern Suburbs Roosters, Balmain Tigers, Wests Tigers and Melbourne Storm
Shane Walker (rugby league born 1978), Australian rugby league coach and former player for the Brisbane Broncos and South Sydney